Gloria Sophia Almonte (born July 19, 1983 in The Bronx, New York City) is an American beauty queen who represented New York at Miss Teen USA 2001 and Miss USA 2007 and represented Carolina municipality at Miss Puerto Rico Universe 2009.

Pageant participation

Miss Teen USA 2001
Almonte won the Miss New York Teen USA 2001  title in late 2000, after placing 2nd Runner-Up in the same competition the year prior. She represented New York at the Miss Teen USA 2001 pageant held in South Padre Island, Texas on August 22, 2001 where placed 1st Runner-Up to Marissa Whitley of Missouri.  This was New York's first placement since 1996 and their highest since 1988, when Jessica Collins also placed 1st Runner-Up.

Miss USA 2001
In late 2005, Almonte competed in the Miss New York USA 2006 pageant for the first time, placing in the Top 15. The following year she won the 2007 title, becoming the fifth former Miss Teen USA delegate to win the pageant. Almonte succeeded Adriana Diaz, a fellow native of The Bronx, who also held the title Miss New York Teen USA and competed in Miss Teen USA 2003. Almonte competed in the Miss USA 2007 pageant, broadcast live from the Kodak Theatre in Los Angeles, California on March 23, 2007, but failed to place. The pageant was won by Miss Tennessee USA, Rachel Smith, who was also Miss Tennessee Teen USA 2002  and placed in the Top 10 of the Miss Teen USA 2002 pageant. Almonte was similar to Miss Georgia Teen USA 1991, Meredith Young, who placed 1st Runner-Up at Miss Teen USA 1991 and later won the Miss Georgia USA 1999  crown but failed to placed at Miss USA 1999.

Miss Puerto Rico Universe 2009
Gloria later represented Carolina at the Miss Puerto Rico Universe 2009 pageant, finishing in the Top 20.

References

External links
Miss New York USA & Miss New York Teen USA official website
Miss Teen USA official website
Miss USA official website 

Living people
1983 births
American people of Puerto Rican descent
Miss USA 2007 delegates
2001 beauty pageant contestants
21st-century Miss Teen USA delegates
People from the Bronx